Cymindis faldermanni is a species of ground beetle in the subfamily Harpalinae. It was described by Johannes von Nepomuk Franz Xaver Gistel in 1838.

References

faldermanni
Beetles described in 1838